In magnetohydrodynamics, the induction equation is a partial differential equation that relates the magnetic field and velocity of an electrically conductive fluid such as a plasma. It can be derived from Maxwell's equations and Ohm's law, and plays a major role in plasma physics and astrophysics, especially in dynamo theory.

Mathematical statement
Maxwell's equations describing the Faraday's and Ampere's laws read:

and

where:
 is the electric field.
 is the magnetic field.
 is the electric current.

The displacement current can be neglected in a plasma as it is negligible compared to the current carried by the free charges.

The electric field can be related to the current density using the Ohm's law:

where 
 is the velocity field.
 is the electric conductivity of the fluid. 

If the fluid moves with a typical speed  and a typical length scale , then

The ratio of these quantities, which is a dimensionless parameter, is called the magnetic Reynolds number:

Perfectly-conducting limit
For a fluid with infinite electric conductivity, the first term in the induction equation vanishes. This is equivalent to a very large magnetic Reynolds number. For example, it can be of order  in a typical star. In this case, the fluid can be called a perfect or ideal fluid. So, the induction equation for an ideal conductive fluid such as most astrophysical plasmas is

This is taken to be a good approximation in dynamo theory, used to explain the magnetic field evolution in the astrophysical environments such as stars, galaxies and accretion discs.

Convective limit
More generally, the equation for the perfectly-conducting limit applies in regions of large spatial scale rather than infinite electric conductivity, (i.e.), as this also makes the magnetic Reynolds number very large such that the diffusion term can be neglected. This limit is called "ideal-MHD" and its most important theorem is Alfvén's theorem (also called the frozen-in flux theorem).

Diffusive limit
For very small magnetic Reynolds numbers, the diffusive term overcomes the convective term. This means magnetic energy is dissipated to heat and other types of energy. The induction equation then reads

 
It is common to define a dissipation time scale  which is the time scale for the dissipation of magnetic energy over a length scale .

See also
 Alfvén's Theorem
 Magnetohydrodynamics
 Maxwell's equations

Magnetohydrodynamics